"My Khakassia" was the national anthem of Khakassia, a republic of Russia. It was adopted in 2007 and relinquished on 11 February 2015, when the current anthem of Khakassia was officially adopted.

Lyrics

See also
 Music in Khakassia

Khakassia
Regional songs
Khakassia